Danny Sutcliffe (born 24 February 1992) is a hurler who plays for the St Jude's club and at senior level for the Dublin county team. Sutcliffe was part of the Dublin minor football team in 2009 whom he won a Leinster title.

Sutcliffe later became one of the "well-known names on the New York side" that competes in the Connacht Senior Football Championship, according to the Irish Independent.

Honours
Dublin
Leinster Minor Football Championship (1): 2009
Leinster Under-21 Hurling Championship (1): 2011
Walsh Cup (1): 2013
Leinster Senior Hurling Championship (1): 2013
National Hurling League Division 1B (1): 2013
All Star (1): 2013

References

 
 

1992 births
Living people
Dual players
Dublin inter-county Gaelic footballers
Dublin inter-county hurlers
Sportspeople from Dublin (city)
St Jude's hurlers